The Movement for a Democratic Slovakia (HZDS) was a national-populist political party in Slovakia. The party is commonly considered as authoritarian and illiberal.

During 1992–1998, HDZS was the leading party of the government, led by Prime Minister Vladimír Mečiar. The party rule was characterized by a fundamental violation of civil liberties, rule of law and a halt to post-communist economic reforms, European integration.

After 1998 parliamentary election, the party remained in opposition for two terms still as the strongest party. In opposition, HZDS moved its positions from Euroscepticism to pro-Europeanism and joined European Democratic Party, although it did not profess EDP's liberal ideology. In the 2006 parliamentary election, the party dropped to 5th place and became a junior partner in the Fico's First Cabinet.

In 2010 parliamentary election the party did not exceed the electoral threshold narrowly  for the first time, and this was repeated in 2012, when it won less than 1%. In 2014, HZDS officially dissolved and designated the Party of Democratic Slovakia as the successor.

History

Velvet Revolution
The party was created as a Slovak nationalist faction of Public Against Violence (VPN), from which it seceded at an extraordinary VPN congress on 27 April 1991.  Called 'Movement for a Democratic Slovakia' (HZDS), it was led by Vladimír Mečiar, who had been deposed as Slovak Prime Minister a month earlier, and composed mostly of the VPN's cabinet members.  The HZDS claimed to represent Slovak national interest, and demanded a more decentralised Czechoslovak confederation.  On 7 May 1992, the HZDS voted for a declaration of independence, but this was defeated 73-57.

At the first election in which it took part, on 5–6 June, the HZDS won an overwhelming victory, with 74 seats on the National Council: two short of an absolute majority.  Mečiar was appointed Prime Minister on 24 June.  Whereas the HZDS wanted a confederation, the Czech elections on the same day were won by Civic Democratic Party, which preferred a tighter federation.  Recognising that these positions were irreconcilable, the National Council voted for Slovakia's Declaration of Independence by 113 votes to 24, and Mečiar concluded formal negotiations over the dissolution of Czechoslovakia.

Dominant party
The party adopted a populist left-wing position economically, and sought to slow the post-Soviet privatisation and liberalisation.

In the first elections after independence, in late 1994, the HZDS retained its dominant position, winning 58 seats (the Peasant's Party of Slovakia won a further 3 on its list).

Decline in opposition
Originally designating itself as a centre-left party, the party moved towards the mainstream right and, in March 2000, renamed itself the 'People's Party – Movement for a Democratic Slovakia' (ĽS-HZDS) to try to achieve membership of the European People's Party (EPP).  However, lingering memories of former anti-Europeanism, conflicting rhetoric, and the presence of three Slovak parties already in the EPP prevented this.  The ĽS-HZDS then looked to the Euro-integrationist European Democratic Party, which it joined in 2009.

The build-up to the 2002 election saw Mečiar exclude a number of prominent members from the party's list of candidates.  Several of the excluded members, led by Ivan Gašparovič, split from the party and founded the similarly titled Movement for Democracy (HZD).  The new party won 3.3% of the vote, eating significantly into the ĽS-HZDS's position, and contributing to it winning only 36 seats.  By 2006, further divisions and splits had reduced it to only 21 MPs.

Back in government
In the parliamentary election of 17 June 2006, the party won 8.8% of the popular vote and 15 out of 150 seats.

Two ĽS-HZDS ministers were sworn in with the Robert Fico government on July 4, 2006:

 Štefan Harabin (deputy prime minister; minister of justice);
 Miroslav Jureňa (minister of agriculture).

In the 2010 election the party lost all its seats, after its share of the vote halved to below the 5% threshold for entering parliament.

Election results

Slovak National Council in the Czechoslovak Federation

National Council of the Slovak Republic

European Parliament

Presidential

See also
 Slovak politics
 Privatization in Slovakia

Notes

References

External links
Official website

Conservative parties in Slovakia
Political parties established in 1991
Political parties disestablished in 2014
1991 establishments in Czechoslovakia
Centrist parties in Slovakia
Nationalist parties in Slovakia
Social conservative parties
Populist parties
2014 disestablishments in Slovakia